Furoxan or 1,2,5-oxadiazole 2-oxide is a heterocycle of the isoxazole family and an amine oxide derivative of furazan. It is a nitric oxide donor. As such, furoxan and its derivatives are actively researched as potential new drugs (Ipramidil) and insensitive high density explosives (4,4’-Dinitro-3,3’-diazenofuroxan).

Furoxanes can be formed by dimerization of nitrile oxides.

References 

Amine oxides
Oxadiazoles